Helensburgh is a suburb of the New Zealand city of Dunedin. It is located to the northwest of the city centre.

Helensburgh is located immediately to the north of Wakari and east of Halfway Bush. Wakari Road, a long, straight semi-rural road, links Taieri Road with Glenleith,  to the northeast, by way of the forest plantations surrounding Ross Creek Reservoir. Helensburgh is bounded in the northeast by the Balmacewen Golf Course.

Demographics

Helensburgh had a population of 1,188 at the 2018 New Zealand census, an increase of 15 people (1.3%) since the 2013 census, and an increase of 117 people (10.9%) since the 2006 census. There were 456 households. There were 570 males and 615 females, giving a sex ratio of 0.93 males per female. The median age was 40.0 years (compared with 37.4 years nationally), with 234 people (19.7%) aged under 15 years, 216 (18.2%) aged 15 to 29, 552 (46.5%) aged 30 to 64, and 183 (15.4%) aged 65 or older.

Ethnicities were 89.9% European/Pākehā, 7.1% Māori, 1.8% Pacific peoples, 7.6% Asian, and 2.3% other ethnicities (totals add to more than 100% since people could identify with multiple ethnicities).

The proportion of people born overseas was 17.9%, compared with 27.1% nationally.

Although some people objected to giving their religion, 56.1% had no religion, 34.6% were Christian, 1.0% were Hindu, 0.3% were Muslim, 0.5% were Buddhist and 2.0% had other religions.

Of those at least 15 years old, 285 (29.9%) people had a bachelor or higher degree, and 111 (11.6%) people had no formal qualifications. The median income was $39,800, compared with $31,800 nationally. 183 people (19.2%) earned over $70,000 compared to 17.2% nationally. The employment status of those at least 15 was that 525 (55.0%) people were employed full-time, 144 (15.1%) were part-time, and 21 (2.2%) were unemployed.

References

Suburbs of Dunedin